Giuseppina Buscemi, known as Giusy (13 April 1993, Mazara del Vallo), is an Italian actress and former model.

She won Miss Italia in 2012. She is married to director Jan Michelini, has three children, and considers herself Catholic.

Filmography

Films

Television

References

External links

 
1993 births
21st-century Italian actresses
Italian female models
Living people
21st-century Italian women
Italian film actresses
Italian stage actresses

Sapienza University of Rome alumni
People from Mazara del Vallo
Italian Roman Catholics